Marcel Hussaud (born 1903, date of death unknown) was a French water polo player. He competed in the men's tournament at the 1920 Summer Olympics.

References

External links
 

1903 births
Year of death missing
French male water polo players
Olympic water polo players of France
Water polo players at the 1920 Summer Olympics
Place of birth missing